Yoo Soo-Hyun (born 13 May 1986) is a South Korean footballer who plays as midfielder for FC Anyang in K League 2.

Career
He made 3 assists in the league match against Police FC on 6 June 2013.

References

External links 

1986 births
Living people
Association football midfielders
South Korean footballers
Jeonnam Dragons players
Suwon FC players
Gimcheon Sangmu FC players
Korea National League players
K League 2 players
K League 1 players